The 1974–75 season was the 29th season in Rijeka's history and their 13th season in the Yugoslav First League. Their 1st place finish in the 1973–74 season meant it was their first season playing in the Yugoslav First League since they were relegated in 1968–69.

Competitions

Overall

Yugoslav First League

Classification

Results summary

Results by round

Matches

First League

Source: rsssf.com

Squad statistics
Competitive matches only.

See also
1974–75 Yugoslav First League

References

External sources
 1974–75 Yugoslav First League at rsssf.com
 Prvenstvo 1974.-75. at nk-rijeka.hr

HNK Rijeka seasons
Rijeka